Gamecock Media Group was an American video game publisher based in Austin, Texas, founded in February 2007 by Mike Wilson, Harry Miller and Rick Stults, formerly founders and executives of Gathering of Developers. The company was acquired by SouthPeak Games in October 2008 and subsequently shut down.

History

Founding 
Gamecock Media Group was founded by Mike Wilson and Harry Miller, alongside Rick Stults. All three had previously co-founded Gathering of Developers in 1998, where they served as chief executive officer (CEO), president and chief financial officer, respectively. Gamecock's existence was announced on February 12, 2007, and coincided with the reveal of the first five games that would be released through Gamecock—Fury by Auran, Insecticide by Crackpot Entertainment, Mushroom Men by Red Fly Studio, Hail to the Chimp by Wideload Games, and Hero by Firefly Studios.

Gamecock used a more hands-off approach and allowed developers creative freedom with their work, as well as letting them keep their own intellectual property. For the new company, Wilson was appointed CEO.

2007 Spike Video Game Awards controversy 
During the 2007 Spike Video Game Awards in Las Vegas, as Ken Levine was about to take the stage and give an acceptance speech for the Game of the Year award for BioShock, Gamecock employees rushed the stage in capes and rooster hats, using the microphone for self-promotion. The interruption resulted in Levine being unable to talk before he was ushered off-stage. Gamecock CEO Wilson later apologized.

Acquisition and closure 
On October 14, 2008, Gamecock was acquired by SouthPeak Games. Subsequently, Gamecock's Austin operations were closed, and all outstanding games were transferred to SouthPeak, with the Gamecock brand being retired.

Games published

References 

2007 establishments in Texas
2008 disestablishments in Texas
Video game companies established in 2007
Video game companies disestablished in 2008
Defunct video game companies of the United States
Video game publishers
Defunct companies based in Texas